Aluminium chlorohydrate is a group of water-soluble, specific aluminium salts having the general formula AlnCl(3n-m)(OH)m. It is used in cosmetics as an antiperspirant and as a coagulant in water purification.

In water purification, this compound is preferred in some cases because of its high charge, which makes it more effective at destabilizing and removing suspended materials than other aluminium salts such as aluminium sulfate, aluminium chloride and various forms of polyaluminium chloride (PAC) and polyaluminium chlorisulfate, in which the aluminium structure results in a lower net charge than aluminium chlorohydrate.  Further, the high degree of neutralization of the HCl results in minimal impact on treated water pH when compared to other aluminium and iron salts.

Uses
Aluminum chlorohydrate is one of the most common active ingredients in commercial antiperspirants. The variation most commonly used in deodorants and antiperspirants is Al2Cl(OH)5.

Aluminum chlorohydrate is also used as a coagulant in water and wastewater treatment processes to remove dissolved organic matter and colloidal particles present in suspension.

Safety
The U.S. Food and Drug Administration considers the use of aluminum chlorohydrate in antiperspirants to be safe and it is permitted in concentrations up to 25%.

Alzheimer's disease
Studies have found only a negligible association between exposure to and long-term use of antiperspirants and Alzheimer's disease. There is no adequate evidence that exposure to aluminium in antiperspirants leads to progressive dementia and Alzheimer's disease.

Heather M. Snyder, the senior associate director of medical and scientific relations for the Alzheimer's Association, has stated, "There was a lot of research that looked at the link between Alzheimer's and aluminum, and there hasn't been any definitive evidence to suggest there is a link".

Breast cancer
The International Journal of Fertility and Women's Medicine found no evidence that certain chemicals used in underarm cosmetics increase the risk of breast cancer.  Ted S. Gansler, the director of medical content for the American Cancer Society, stated "There is no convincing evidence that antiperspirant or deodorant use increases cancer risk".

However, there is continued concern over the use of aluminum chlorohydrate in cosmetics as the risk of toxic build up over time has not been ruled out. The Scientific Committee on Consumer Safety (SCCS) is currently designing a study to analyse the build up of aluminum chlorohydrate via dermal penetration to assess the risk of toxic build up.

Structure
Aluminum chlorohydrate is best described as an inorganic polymer and as such is difficult to structurally characterize. However, techniques such as gel permeation chromatography, X-ray crystallography and 27Al-NMR have been used in research by various groups including that of Nazar and Laden to show that the material is based on Al13 units with a Keggin ion structure and that this base unit then undergoes complex transformations to form larger poly-aluminum complexes.

Synthesis
Aluminum chlorohydrate can be commercially manufactured by reacting aluminum with hydrochloric acid. A number of aluminum-containing raw materials can be used, including aluminum metal, alumina trihydrate, aluminum chloride, aluminum sulfate and combinations of these. The products can contain by-product salts, such as sodium/calcium/magnesium chloride or sulfate.

Because of the explosion hazard related to hydrogen produced by the reaction of aluminum metal with hydrochloric acid, the most common industrial practice is to prepare a solution of aluminum chlorohydrate (ACH) by reacting aluminum hydroxide with hydrochloric acid. The ACH product is reacted with aluminum ingots at 100 °C using steam in an open mixing tank.  The Al to ACH ratio and the time of reaction allowed determines the polymer form of the PAC n to m ratio.

See also
 Aluminum chloride
 Aluminum hydroxide
 Deodorant
 Keggin structure

References

Aluminium compounds
Chlorides